Stella-Iro Ledaki (Στέλλα-Ηρώ Λεδάκη; born 18 July 1988 in Chania, Greece) is a Greek pole vaulter. She competed at the 2012 Summer Olympics.

Competition record

References 

1988 births
Living people
Greek female pole vaulters
Athletes (track and field) at the 2012 Summer Olympics
Olympic athletes of Greece
Sportspeople from Chania
Mediterranean Games gold medalists for Greece
Athletes (track and field) at the 2013 Mediterranean Games
Mediterranean Games medalists in athletics
Competitors at the 2013 Summer Universiade
21st-century Greek women